Arcos de Jalón is a municipality located in the province of Soria, Castile and León, Spain. , it had a population of 1,782.

List of settlements included in the municipality
 Aguilar de Montuenga
 Chaorna
 Jubera
 Judes
 Iruecha
 Layna
 Montuenga de Soria
 Sagides
 Somaén
 Urex de Medinaceli
 Utrilla
 Velilla de Medinaceli

References

Municipalities in the Province of Soria